The brown scrub robin (Cercotrichas signata) is a species of bird in the family Muscicapidae. It is found in Eswatini, Mozambique and, South Africa. Its natural habitat is subtropical dry or moist forests.

Races
There are two accepted races:
 Cercotrichas signata subsp. signata – South African coastal bush and Afromontane forest
Description: Greyish brown plumage
 Cercotrichas signata subsp. tongensis – coastal plain from northern KZN to southern Mozambique
Description: Smaller with shorter bill. Paler brown plumage above and warmer buff plumage below. More conspicuous supercilium and moustache stripe.

References

External links
 Brown (scrub) robin - Species text in The Atlas of Southern African Birds.

brown scrub robin
Birds of Southern Africa
brown scrub robin
Taxonomy articles created by Polbot
Taxobox binomials not recognized by IUCN